The 2018–19 Lehigh Mountain Hawks women's basketball team represents Lehigh University during the 2018–19 NCAA Division I women's basketball season. The Mountain Hawks, led by twenty-fourth year head coach Sue Troyan, play their home games at Stabler Arena and are members of the Patriot League. They finished the season 21–10, 12–6 in Patriot League play to finish in second place. They advanced to the semifinals of the Patriot League women's tournament where they lost to American. Despite having 21 wins and a better record, they were not invited to a postseason tournament.

Roster

Schedule

|-
!colspan=9 style=| Non-conference regular season

|-
!colspan=9 style=| Patriot League regular season

|-
!colspan=9 style=| Patriot League Women's Tournament

See also
 2018–19 Lehigh Mountain Hawks men's basketball team

References

Lehigh
Lehigh Mountain Hawks women's basketball seasons
Lehigh
Lehigh